Rosa Zafferani (born 16 August 1960) is a Sammarinese politician. She was a member of the Sammarinese Christian Democratic Party until she left with the rest of the left-wing faction of the party to form the Centre Democrats.

Political career
Zafferani served as Secretary of State for health, education and the interior. She served as Captain Regent for the April through October 1999 term prior to reassuming the role for a second time, together with Federico Pedini Amati, from April through October 2008.

See also
 Politics of San Marino

References

1960 births
20th-century women rulers
21st-century women politicians
Captains Regent of San Marino
Members of the Grand and General Council
Centre Democrats (San Marino) politicians
Female heads of government
Female heads of state
Living people
Politicians of Catholic political parties
Sammarinese women in politics
American people of Sammarinese descent